POMCUS (Prepositioning Of Materiel Configured in Unit Sets) was a system that kept large amounts of pre-positioned U.S. military equipment in West Germany during the Cold War.

In the event of war with the Soviets, American soldiers could be flown with their "to-accompany-troops" (TAT) gear on Civil Reserve Air Fleet commercial airliners to use this pre-positioned equipment. The equipment was set up in unit configurations to aid in force building and movement to support the US Army's general defensive plan (GDP). In the early 1980s, most of the equipment for POMCUS came from US Army units in the USA and had to be upgraded to meet specifications for pre-positioning in Europe. By the late 1980s, the plan had evolved to pre-position Six Divisions of equipment in  the Netherlands, Belgium and Germany.Three Divisions were pre-positioned, with other sites being considered for the other three divisions, when the Berlin wall fell, and the Soviet Union no longer existed. Plans were then cut back severely and sites that were considered in Belgium and the Netherlands were cancelled. POMCUS was considered to be so important that a "Warm-Base" Hospital was completed in the Netherlands, in 1988. The hospital was completely equipped, so that in the event of war, doctors could be flown in and immediately take care of injured military personnel. The hospital had the latest equipment available at that time, and was kept in operating condition by local Dutch personnel. Originally, POMCUS sites were primarily simply guarded, fenced-in lots of pre-loaded, maintained vehicles and weapons systems ready to roll, although the precursor to POMCUS sites was a series of underground storage areas taken from the Germans in Pirmasens and the outlying areas Husterhoeh Kaserne utilised to store combat-readied armour. During the late 1960s-1980s, the above-ground POMCUS facilities were updated into large aluminium-over-steel warehouses, which provided the benefits of less weathering and lower maintenance requirements for the systems stored in them, as well as providing first-line defence against EMP radiation which could affect the electronics in both the communications systems and the recently implemented solid-state ignition systems on some vehicles. POMCUS sites were one of the first Army installations that used Bar Codes on equipment, so that whenever a piece of equipment left a warehouse the bar code registered that the equipment had left its storage area.

References 

 POMCUS at Defense Technical Information Center

External links
POMCUS at Everything2 

Military logistics of the United States